Isabella Melo Assis Costa (born April 18, 1993) is a Brazilian model.

Early life
Melo was born on April 18, 1993 at Recife, Pernambuco, Brazil. Melo started modeling early at 15, when she was already taking the first steps in national catwalks. In 2012, Melo performed in the New York Fashion Week, London, Milan and Paris with 53 fashion shows for brands like Chanel, Dolce & Gabbana and Lacoste. She was the October 2012 Vogue Girl in Korea.

Career
Melo has worked for brands such as Givenchy, John Galliano, Emporio Armani, Giorgio Armani, Just Cavalli, Kenzo, Oscar de la Renta and Vivienne Westwood. Melo works modeling with several agencies as Ford Models Brasil, Premier Model Management, Mega Models and Women Management.

References

External links

 
 Isabella Melo homepage at supermodels.nl

1993 births
Living people
Brazilian female models
People from Recife
IMG Models models